Krkjan or Karkijahan is a settlement near the city of Stepanakert that is, de facto, part of the breakaway ; de jure it is part of Azerbaijan. The village had an Armenian-majority population prior to the Khaibalikend massacre in 1919 and subsequently an Azerbaijani-majority population prior to the Nagorno-Karabakh conflict in 1988.

History

Pre-Soviet period 
In 1886, the village had an Armenian-majority population, consisting entirely of farmers.

In June 1919, the village and the neighboring villages of Ghaibalishen (Khaibalikend), Jamilli, and Pahlul were looted and destroyed in the Khaibalikend massacre with 600-700 ethnic Armenians being killed by armed Kurdish irregulars and Azerbaijani soldiers.

Soviet Union 
During the early Soviet period, the village was a district within the city of Stepanakert in the Nagorno-Karabakh Autonomous Oblast of the Azerbaijan SSR, known as Karkijan. In 1988, the district was given the status of an urban-type settlement, after Azerbaijani IDPs from Stepanakert settled in the village. Tensions steadily grew between Azerbaijanis of Karkijahan and Armenians of Stepanakert. In one incident on 5 May 1989, three locals and four soldiers were wounded. Similar incidents were recorded in July 1989, and November 1991.

First Nagorno-Karabakh War 
The settlement had an Azerbaijani-majority population of 1,796 inhabitants prior to the outbreak of the Nagorno-Karabakh conflict in 1988. Following the expulsion of ethnic Azerbaijanis from the city of Stepanakert in 1988, most of them settled in Karkijahan. Armenian troops entered Karkijahan on 29 December 1991, and established full control over it the following day. By the time of its capture, most of the village's Azerbaijani population had already left the village. According to Azerbaijan, 34 people, including 3 women and 2 minors, were killed during the battles. During the hostilities in Karkijahan, a journalist of Radio Mayak, Leonid Lazarevich, was killed. Azerbaijani forces recaptured the village by 31 December, however it was finally retaken by Armenian forces in late January - early February 1992. The village was subsequently burned to the ground by Armenian forces.

Gallery

References

External links 
 
 World Gazetteer: Azerbaijan – World-Gazetteer.com

Stepanakert